Ashford Green Corridors is a   Local Nature Reserve in Ashford in Kent, England. It is owned and managed by  Ashford Borough Council.

This site has a lake, ponds, pollarded trees, a meadow and parkland. Birds on Singleton Lake include kingfishers.

Paths and roads go through this linear site.

References

Local Nature Reserves in Kent